{{DISPLAYTITLE:C6O6}} 
The molecular formula C6O6 (molar mass: 168.06 g/mol, exact mass: 167.9695 u) may refer to: 

 Cyclohexanehexone, also known as hexaketocyclohexane or triquinoyl
 Ethylenetetracarboxylic dianhydride